The 2008 Finlandia Trophy was the 13th edition of an annual senior-level international figure skating competition held in Finland. It was held at the Valtti Areena in Vantaa between October 9 and 12, 2008. Skaters competed in the disciplines of men's singles, ladies' singles, and ice dancing.

Results

Men

Ladies

Ice dancing

External links
 2008 Finlandia Trophy results
 Finlandia Trophy

Finlandia Trophy
Finlandia Trophy, 2008
Finlandia Trophy, 2008